San Solano is a small rural village located in the San Pedro del Paraná district, Itapúa department in Paraguay. It is the hometown of former Paraguayan president Fernando Armindo Lugo Méndez.

Populated places in the San Pedro Department, Paraguay